Señorita bananas (also known as Monkoy, Cariñosa, or Cuarenta Dias) are diploid cultivars of the banana Musa acuminata originating in the Philippines.  They are very small stout bananas which, like all bananas belonging to the AA cultivar group, are known for being extraordinarily sweet.

Taxonomy
Señorita bananas are diploid (AA) cultivars of the wild seeded banana Musa acuminata. Its accepted name is Musa acuminata (AA Group) 'Señorita'. In the Philippines it is known as 'Monkoy', 'Sarot-sut', 'Cariños' or 'Cariñosa', 'Arnibal' or 'Inarnibal' in Negros Occidental (literally "syrup" in Hiligaynon), and 'Lunsuranon' in Surigao. It is also known as 'Pisang Lampung' in Indonesia. It is also commonly known as the 'Forty day banana' (Filipino/Spanish: 'Cuarenta Dias', Malaysian: 'Pisang Empat Puluh Hari'), a reference to the average amount of time between flowering and bearing fruits of this cultivar.

Description

The pseudostem is green and shiny with a pink-purple underlying color. The leaves are very waxy with petioles that are sometimes bordered with pink-purple to red. The inflorescence hangs vertically with red-purple bracts which are yellow or green on the inside surface. Male flowers are colored yellow and are persistent. The plant begins to flower at about 231 days after planting. The time period from flowering to harvesting is 40 days (hence its common name in the Philippines of "'Cuarenta dias''").

The fruits are straight with a rounded transverse section and a bottle-necked apex. Fruits are light green and turn a light yellow when ripe. The skin is very thin and easily cracks when overripe, they also tend to snap off the stems by themselves when ripe.

Uses

Fruits of the Señorita bananas are not as common as Lacatan and Latundan for dessert bananas in the Philippines, but they are still highly regarded for their exceptionally sweet taste and soft creamy flesh. They are seldom cultivated in large quantities due to their vulnerability to diseases and thus are more commonly found sold in small farmer stalls. They are popular treats for tourists visiting rural areas in the Philippines.

They are almost always eaten fresh, as their relative fragility makes it difficult to store or transport them over long distances. They are also rarely processed or used in cooking.

See also
 Banana cultivar groups
 Musa

References

Banana cultivars